Zagórze is the southernmost district of Rumia, located in the valley of Zagórska Struga.

References

Wejherowo County
Neighbourhoods in Poland